Karin Bloemen is a Dutch actress and singer. She has appeared in several films and television shows in the Netherlands. 
Since 1983 Bloemen is a singer and cabaret artist who is very extrovert and likes to draw attention to herself with her striking appearance, her beautiful songs and lively performances.  In her theatre shows and concerts she makes use of her fabulous voice and expressive facial expressions and she plays the audience very well.  She is exuberant and extroverted and can also be subdued and sensitive.

Before she had even finished her study at the Academy of Arts in Amsterdam in 1984, she won several prizes. She was awarded the Pisuisse Prize, which is an award for the student with the best theatre performance within the Academy. After graduation, the Pall Mall Export Prize quickly followed this prize. This is a prize for the promotion and development of young artists.

Bloemen soon became a well-known singer and actress in several Dutch musicals, films, television and radio programs. Her 1984 anti-apartheid song Zuid-Afrika was written by Jeroen van Merwijk. In 1994 she performed it in front of Nelson Mandela.

Within six years of graduating, she made her debut in her first theatre show- Bosje Bloemen (Bunch of Flowers). This was the first show in a series of successful gigs including:
 
 Karin in Concert 
 La Flowers
 Everything ... La on Tour 
 Late Nights
 Chameleon
 The Diva and the Divan
 Various Christmas shows
 Her 25-year Jubilee Show
 Absobloodylutely Bloemiliciously Fanf*ckintastic. 2011-2012
 Purper 5
 Purper Gala
 Niet Gesnoeid
 Six late Nights
 La Bloemen's Licht-In-Donkere-Dagen Kerst-Bal 2002/2004
 La Bloemens Kerst Show 2005/2006
 Beter Laat
 Overgang
 Witte Nar
 Kerst met een grote K (2014)
 Volle  bloei (2017)
 Souvenirs (2019)

The VARA has televised many of her theatre shows and these have been released on DVDs

Personal life 

Bloemen's parents separated when she was 3 years old. She was forbidden to have any contact with her father.
La Bloemen was an incest victim.

She mentors her nephew after his mother Annelies (Bloemen's sister) died in a fire in 1989. Another sister Inge died of epilepsy in February 2014.

She has talked openly about her own pregnancy, her burnout and her overweight issue which she has addressed.
She is married to guitarist Marnix Busstra and they have two daughters.

Bloemen is an active supporter of organizations that fight poverty and sexual abuse.

She is well known as a gay icon.

The proceeds of one of her recordings was donated to mother-and-child health projects in Asia, notably Bangladesh.

In 2005 she won a court case against a Dutch magazine for publishing private photographs of her family without permission. 

Since April 2016 she has a new manager: Mike Dobbinga.

Accolades

Karen has been honored in the course of her career with:

1983: Pisuisse Prize
1984: Pall Mall Export prize
1994: Golden Harp
Edison Prize category cabaret
1996: The Annie MG Schmidt Prize for her interpretation of the song Geen kind meer, lyrics by Jan Boerstoel, music by Marnix Busstra
In April 2011 Bloemen became an Officer in the Order of Oranje-Nassau.

Discography

DVD

References

External links 

1960 births
Living people
Dutch cabaret performers
Dutch women singers
Dutch musical theatre actresses
Dutch stage actresses
Dutch television actresses
Dutch voice actresses
Music in the movement against apartheid
International opposition to apartheid in South Africa
Anti-apartheid activists
Officers of the Order of Orange-Nassau
People from Alkmaar